The rufous-throated wren-babbler (Spelaeornis caudatus) is a species of bird in the family Timaliidae. It is found in Bhutan, India, and Nepal.

Its natural habitat is the Eastern Himalayan broadleaf forests. It is becoming rare due to habitat loss.

References

Collar, N. J. & Robson, C. 2007. Family Timaliidae (Babblers)  pp. 70 – 291 in; del Hoyo, J., Elliott, A. & Christie, D.A. eds. Handbook of the Birds of the World, Vol. 12. Picathartes to Tits and Chickadees. Lynx Edicions, Barcelona.

rufous-throated wren-babbler
Birds of Bhutan
Birds of Northeast India
Fauna of Sikkim
rufous-throated wren-babbler
rufous-throated wren-babbler
Taxonomy articles created by Polbot